The Battle of Lapua was fought between Swedish and Russian troops on 14 July 1808 at Lapua, Finland. The Russians had set up defences around Lapua. The Swedes tried to outflank and surround the defending Russians. The Björneborg Regiment under Georg Carl von Döbeln distinguished itself during the battle.
In the end the Russians managed to retreat, but the victory was an important one for the Swedish as it allowed them to continue their offensive.

Notes, citations and sources

Notes

Citations

Sources

Lapua
Lapua 1808
Lapua
Lapua
Lapua
History of South Ostrobothnia
July 1808 events